The 2010 Trophée Éric Bompard was the final event of six in the 2010–11 ISU Grand Prix of Figure Skating, a senior-level international invitational competition series. It was held at the Palais Omnisports de Paris-Bercy in Paris on 25–28 November. Medals were awarded in the disciplines of men's singles, ladies' singles, pair skating, and ice dancing. Skaters earned points toward qualifying for the 2010–11 Grand Prix Final.

Results

Men

Ladies

Pairs

Ice dancing

References

External links

 ISU entries/results page
 
 
 
 
 
 

Trophée Éric Bompard, 2010
Internationaux de France
Trophée Éric Bompard
Figure
International figure skating competitions hosted by France
Trophée Éric Bompard
Trophée Éric Bompard